Xanthodaphne tropica is a species of sea snail, a marine gastropod mollusk in the family Raphitomidae.

Description

Distribution
This marine species was found on the Nazca Ridge in the Southeast Pacific.

References

 Sysoev, A. V., and D. L. Ivanov. "Nex Taxa of the Family Turridae (Gastropoda, Toxoglossa) from the Naska-ridge (Southeast Pacific)." Zoologichesky Zhurnal 64.2 (1985): 194–205.

External links
 

tropica
Gastropods described in 1985